Tanja Magdalena Schuster is a taxonomist from Austria, and the first Pauline Ladiges Plant Systematics Fellow, holding a joint position with the School of Biosciences, University of Melbourne, Victoria, Australia, and the National Herbarium of Victoria, Royal Botanic Gardens Melbourne. Schuster also worked as curator of the Norton-Brown Herbarium at the University of Maryland, College Park.

In 2011, Schuster created the genus Duma for some species previously placed in Muehlenbeckia, but which were shown by molecular phylogenetic studies to form a distinct clade. The name is derived from the Latin for "thorn-bush."

Selected works

Taxa authored by Schuster
Schuster is listed in the International Plant Names Index as the author or co-author of 62 names, including:
 Duma T.M.Schust.
Koenigia alaskana T.M.Schust. & Reveal (syn. Polygonum alpinum)
Koenigia alpina T.M.Schust. & Reveal (syn. Aconogonon alpina)
Koenigia campanulata (Hook.f.) T.M.Schust. & Reveal (syn. Persicaria campanulata)
Koenigia davisiae T.M.Schust. & Reveal

References

External links

Living people
Year of birth missing (living people)
Academic staff of the University of Melbourne
University of Melbourne women
Wake Forest University alumni
Lehman College alumni